Tighnabruaich; is a village on the Cowal peninsula, on the western arm of the Kyles of Bute in Argyll and Bute, Scotland. In 2011 the population was 660. It is west of Glasgow and north of the Isle of Arran.

Tighnabruaich is now part of a continuous coastal strip of housing that joins onto Kames.

Transport

The A8003 was built in the 1960s. The village was more reliant on the sea for the transport of passengers and freight until the completion of the shorter A8003.

History

A pier was possibly built in the 1830s by the Castle Steamship Company, a forerunner of MacBrayne. It was a stopping place for paddle steamers and Clyde puffers. The wooden pier was rebuilt in 1885 by the Tighnabruaich Estate who owned it from 1840 until 1950. George Olding owned it until 1965 when it became the responsibility of the local council.

Passenger services on and around the Clyde were developed after the PS Comet was introduced into service in 1812 and tourism developed with the introduction of cruises through the Kyles around Bute, to Arran and along Loch Fyne.

The 1st Glasgow Company of the Boys Brigade own a camp-site near Tighnabruich which is used by many Boys' Brigade Companies from around the country. This follows in the tradition of the 1st Glasgow camping in the area since 1886.

RNLI

The Royal National Lifeboat Institution maintains an inshore lifeboat station in Tighnabruaich and currently has an Atlantic 85 type lifeboat and tractor on station.

Sport and leisure

The pier at Tighnabruaich is called at by the paddle steamer  during its summer season sailings on the Firth of Clyde.

Tighnabruaich is popular for sailing and yachting and has a sailing school.

Tighnabruaich was voted "the prettiest village in Argyll, Lomond and Stirlingshire" in 2002 and featured in the More4/Channel 4 programme Penelope Keith's Hidden Villages (Series 3, Episode 2).

Kyles Athletic Shinty Club

Shinty is the major sport in the village which is home to Kyles Athletic who have won the Camanachd Cup more than any other team apart from Newtonmore and Kingussie.

References

External links

 Kyles Athletic official website
 

Tighnabruaich
Tighnabruaich
Highlands and Islands of Scotland
Populated coastal places in Scotland